The Third Australian Recording Industry Association Music Awards (generally known as the ARIA Music Awards or simply The ARIAS) was held on 6 March 1989 at the Darling Harbour Convention Centre in Sydney. First Australian host Greedy Smith of Mental As Anything was assisted by presenters George Martin, Jono & Dano, Barry Bissell of Take 40 Australia, Peter Collins, Peter Jamieson, Jonathan King and Brian Smith to distribute 24 awards. There were no live performances and the awards were not televised.

Some significant changes were made for the third ARIA Awards. In addition to previous categories, Best Independent Release, Breakthrough Artist – Single and Breakthrough Artist – Album were added. The ARIA Hall of Fame inducted two artists: Dame Nellie Melba and Ross Wilson. An Outstanding Achievement Award was presented to INXS. Music journalist, Anthony O'Grady cited ARIA spokesperson Peter Rix, who had felt that The Church's win Single of the Year with "Under the Milky Way" was a highlight. Rix elaborated, "the industry was capable of judging music on its merit, not by who'd recorded it. The Church were no one's darlings but they had written a great song."

Presenters 

The ARIA Awards ceremony was hosted by singer-songwriter Greedy Smith from Mental as Anything. Presenters were:

Awards

Winners for each category are bolded with nominees provided below each winner.

ARIA Awards
Album of the Year 
Crowded House – Temple of Low Men
1927 – ...ish
Big Pig – Bonk
The Black Sorrows – Hold On To Me
John Farnham – Age of Reason
Single of the Year 
The Church – "Under the Milky Way"
1927 – "That's When I Think of You"
Crowded House – "Better Be Home Soon"
John Farnham – "Age of Reason"
INXS – "Never Tear Us Apart"
Best Group 
INXS – "Never Tear Us Apart"
The Black Sorrows – Hold On To Me
Crowded House – Temple of Low Men
The Go-Betweens – 16 Lovers Lane
Midnight Oil – "Dreamworld"
Best Female Artist 
Kate Ceberano – You've Always Got the Blues
Marcia Hines – "The Lord's Prayer"
Wendy Matthews – You've Always Got the Blues
Kylie Minogue – Kylie
Sharon O'Neill – "We're Only Human"
Best Male Artist 
Jimmy Barnes – Barnestorming
Stephen Cummings  – A Life Is a Life
John Farnham – Age of Reason
Paul Kelly & The Coloured Girls – "Forty Miles to Saturday Night"
James Reyne – "Motor's Too Fast"
Best New Talent 
Johnny Diesel & the Injectors – "Don't Need Love"
Died Pretty – Lost
Go 101 – "Build It Up"
Roaring Jack – The Cat Among the Pigeons
The State – "Real Love"
Breakthrough Artist – Album
1927 – ...ish
Rockmelons – Tales of the City
Catfish – Unlimited Address
Kylie Minogue – Kylie
Schnell Fenster – The Sound of Trees
Breakthrough Artist – Single
1927 – "That's When I Think of You"
Catfish – "When You Dance"
Go 101 – "Build It Up"
The Hippos – "Dark Age"
Johnny Diesel & the Injectors – "Don't Need Love"
Schnell Fenster – "Whisper"
Best Country Album 
John Williamson – Boomerang Café
Flying Emus – "I Just Want to Dance With You"
Slim Dusty – G'day, G'day!
Smoky Dawson & Trevor Knight –  "High Country"
Jenine Vaughan – "Gypsy Man"
Best Indigenous Release 
Weddings Parties Anything – Roaring Days
Kev Carmody – Pillars of Society
Flying Emus– "This Town" / "Darling Street"
Midnight Oil – "Dreamworld"
Dave Steel – "The Hardest Part"
Best Adult Contemporary Album 
Crowded House – Temple of Low Men
The Black Sorrows – Hold On To Me
Kate Ceberano & Wendy Matthews – You've Always Got the Blues
John Farnham – Age of Reason
Little River Band – Monsoon
Best Comedy Release 
The Comedy Company – The Comedy Company Album
Austen Tayshus – "Highway Corroboree"
Club Veg – Members & Guests & Things
Con the Fruiterer – "A Cuppla Days"
Kylie Mole – "So Excellent" / "I Go I Go"
Rodney Rude – Not Guilty
Best Independent Release
TISM – "Apathy"
Eric Bogle – Something of Value
Flederman – Flederman
Larry Sitsky – Contemporary Australian Piano
The Spliffs – "Sixteen"
Highest Selling Album 
John Farnham – Age of Reason
The Comedy Company – The Comedy Company Album
Crowded House – Temple of Low Men
1927 – ...ish
Kylie Minogue – Kylie
Various – Australia All Over Vol. 2
Highest Selling Single 
Kylie Minogue – "I Should Be So Lucky"
1927 – "If I Could"
Australian Olympians – "You're Not Alone"
Crowded House – "Better Be Home Soon"
John Farnham – "Age of Reason"
Go 101 – "Build It Up"

Fine Arts Awards
Best Jazz Album 
Wizards of Oz – Soundtrack
Kate Ceberano & Wendy Matthews – You've Always Got the Blues
Cool Dudes – Cool Dudes 
James Morrison – Postcards from Down Under
Various Artists – Jazz Live At Soup Plus
Best Classical Album 
Flederman – Flederman
George Dreyfus – Rush, The Adventures of Sebastian the Fox and Other Goodies
Jennifer McGregor – The Jennifer McGregor Album
Sydney Symphony Orchestra, Australian Youth Orchestra, Joan Carden, John Howard – Australia Day / Child of Australia
Various Artists – Tropic of Capricorn
Best Children's Album 
Peter Combe – Newspaper Mama
Darryl Cotton – Just for Kids  
Noni Hazlehurst – Shout and Whisper
Harold G Raffe and Co – Harold and Friends
John Schumann – John Schumann Goes Looby-Loo
Don Spencer – Australian Animal Songs
The Wayfarers – Home Among the Gum Trees – Songs for Aussie Kids
Fay White – Did You See The Wind Today?
Best Original Soundtrack / Cast / Show Recording 
Various (Kate Ceberano and Wendy Matthews) – You've Always Got the Blues (songs from the ABC TV series Stringer)
 Various artists – Rikky and Pete (original soundtrack)
David Reeves – Seven Little Australians (original Australian cast)
Bruce Rowland – The Man from Snowy River II (original soundtrack)
 Various artists– Boulevard of Broken Dreams (original soundtrack)

Artisan Awards
Song of the Year 
Neil Finn – "Better Be Home Soon" (Crowded House)
Andrew Farriss / Michael Hutchence – "Never Tear Us Apart" (INXS)
Robert Forster / Grant McLennan – "Streets of Your Town" (The Go-Betweens)
Todd Hunter / Johanna Pigott – "Age of Reason" (John Farnham)
Steve Kilbey / Karin Jansson – "Under The Milky Way" – (The Church)
Producer of the Year
Ross Fraser – Age of Reason – John Farnham, "When the Word Came Down" – Separate Tables and "Real Love" – The State
Joe Camilleri & Jeff Burstein – Hold On To Me – The Black Sorrows
Charles Fisher – "That's When I Think of You" – 1927 and Fingertips – The Cockroaches
Simon Hussey – Edge – Daryl Braithwaite
Les Karski & Guy Gray – "Dark Age" – The Hippos and "Clarity of Mind" – Spy vs Spy
Engineer of the Year 
Doug Brady – "Iron Lung" – Big Pig (remix), Hold Onto To Me – The Black Sorrows, Age of Reason – John Farnham, "River" – Dragon, Children of the Western World – Steve Grace, "Cars and Planes" – Machinations (remix), "Change My Sex" – Separate Tables, "When the Word Came Down" – Separate Tables, "Real Love" – The State, "So Lonely Now" – The State
Jim Bonnefond – ...ish – 1927 and Fingertips – The Cockroaches
Guy Gray – "Dark Age" – The Hippos, "Pick You Up" – Tony Llewellyn, "Dreamworld" – Midnight Oil, "Clarity of Mind" – Spy vs Spy
Ian McKenzie – Chantoozies – Chantoozies
David Price – Groove – Eurogliders and "Home" – Noiseworks
Best Video 
Richard Lowenstein –  "Never Tear Us Apart" – INXS
Claudia Castle – "Big Hotel" – Big Pig
Andrew de Groot – "Dreamworld" – Midnight Oil
Paul Elliott – "When You Come" – Crowded House
Stephen Priest & Steve Hopkins – "Age of Reason" – John Farnham
Best Cover Art 
Nick Seymour – Temple of Low Men – Crowded House
The Add Agency – Up from Down Under – Tommy Emmanuel
Bruce Goold – Wild Desert Rose – Coloured Stone
Phil Judd – The Sound of Trees – Schnell Fenster
Malpass & Burrows – Age of Reason – John Farnham
Robyn Stacey & Richard Allan – Lost – Died Pretty
Eric Weideman – ...ish – 1927

Achievement awards

Outstanding Achievement Award
 INXS

ARIA Hall of Fame inductees
The Hall of Fame inductees were:
Dame Nellie Melba
Ross Wilson

References

External links
ARIA Awards official website
List of 1989 winners

1989 music awards
1989 in Australian music
ARIA Music Awards